Number 201 Squadron is a squadron of the Royal Air Force. It currently operates the Boeing Poseidon MRA1 from RAF Lossiemouth, Moray. 

It is the only squadron affiliated with Guernsey, in the Channel Islands. This affiliation started in 1935 and is commemorated in the museum on Castle Cornet. Its history goes even further back than the RAF itself, being formed originally as No. 1 Squadron RNAS on 17 October 1914. It had previously operated the Hawker Siddeley Nimrod MR2, based at RAF Kinloss, Moray, between January 1982 and March 2010.

History

Formation and World War I

Despite its high squadron number, 201 Squadron is one of the oldest squadrons in the RAF. It was formed as No. 1 Squadron of the Royal Naval Air Service (RNAS) on 17 October 1914, and reformed under that designation on 6 December 1916, only being renumbered to 201 Squadron on the formation of the RAF on 1 April 1918 – all the RNAS squadrons getting new numbers by adding 200 to their original number.

A Victoria Cross was won by a member of No. 1 Squadron RNAS when on 7 June 1915 Sub-Lieutenant R.A.J. Warneford shot down Zeppelin LZ.37.

After the war the squadron was disbanded at RAF Eastleigh on 31 December 1919. Eighteen flying aces served in the squadron during the course of the war, including such notables as
Samuel Kinkead, 
Stanley Wallace Rosevear, 
Richard Minifie, 
Roderic Dallas, 
George Gates, 
Reginald Brading, 
Maxwell Findlay, 
Cyril Ridley, 
Thomas Gerrard, 
John Jones, James Henry Forman, 
Charles Dawson Booker, 
Thomas Culling, 
future Air Vice-Marshal F. H. Maynard, 
Robert McLaughlin, and
Hazel Wallace.

Flying boat squadron
The squadron was reformed at RAF Calshot on 1 January 1929 by expanding no. 480 Flight, a Supermarine Southampton flying boat unit. In April 1936 the Southamptons gave way to the Saro London, which the squadron still had on strength when World War II broke out. Supermarine Stranraers flew shortly with the squadron in 1939, but by April 1940 the squadron was operational on the Short Sunderland, which would remain the squadron equipment for almost seventeen years up till 28 February 1957, when the squadron was disbanded at RAF Pembroke Dock.

Shackletons and Nimrods
The squadron was reformed at RAF St. Mawgan, when No. 220 Squadron RAF was renumbered to 201 Squadron. The squadron flew the next twelve years with the Avro Shackleton MR.3, a version that used a tricycle undercarriage as opposed to the earlier tailwheel variants. Following the Shackleton's retirement, the squadron converted to Nimrods in October 1970. 

The squadron was active for over a decade in the Gulf region, in support of both Gulf War 1 and 2 and more recently the conflict in Afghanistan. Until March 2010, the squadron was also on active duty in the UK and maintained continuous 24-hour/365-day search and rescue standby, shared with the sister 120 Squadron, both flying from RAF Kinloss. The Nimrod MR2 was withdrawn in March 2010, and the squadron was formally disbanded on 26 May 2011. It had been preparing to operate the Nimrod MRA4 but this aircraft was cancelled under the 2010 Strategic Defence and Security Review.

Reformation 
In July 2017, it was announced that No. 201 Squadron would be one of two RAF squadrons to fly the P-8A Poseidon, based at RAF Lossiemouth.  It was later confirmed the squadron would stand up in the 'Summer of 2021' operating in the role and at location as previously stated. No. 201 Squadron reformed on 7 August 2021, reclaiming their Squadron Standard from Government House in Guernsey on 22 October.

Notable squadron members
 Reginald Alexander John Warneford (Royal Naval Air Service)
 Roderic Dallas (Royal Naval Air Service)
 Richard Minifie (Royal Naval Air Service)
 John Harris (Royal Air Force), Officer Commanding 1973–75

Aircraft operated

The squadron has operated the following aircraft types.

 Various (Oct 1914 – Feby 1915)
 Nieuport 17 (Dec 1916 – Jan 1917)
 Sopwith Triplane (Dec 1916 – Dec 1917)
 Sopwith Camel (Dec 1917 – Feb 1919)
 Sopwith Snipe (Oct 1918 – Oct 1918)
 Supermarine Southampton Mk.II (Jan 1929 – Dec 1936)
 Saro London Mk.I (Apr 1936 – Jun 1938)
 Saro London Mk.II (Jan 1938 – 1938)
 Short Sunderland Mk.I (Apr 1940 – Jan 1942)
 Short Sunderland Mk.II (May 1941 – Mar 1944)
 Short Sunderland Mk.III (Jan 1942 – Jun 1945)
 Short Sunderland Mk.V (Feb 1945 – Feb 1957)
 Short Seaford Mk.I (Mar 1946 – Apr 1946)
 Avro Shackleton MR.3 (Oct 1958 – Dec 1970)
 Hawker-Siddeley Nimrod MR.1 (Oct 1970 – Feb 1983)
 BAe Nimrod MR2 (Jan 1982 – Mar 2010)
 Boeing Poseidon MRA1 (Aug 2021 – present)

Squadron bases

Battle honours 
No. 201 Squadron has received the following battle honours. Those marked with an asterisk (*) may be emblazoned on the squadron standard.

 Western Front  (1915–1918)*
 Arras*
 Ypres (1917)*
 Somme (1918)*
 Amiens
 Hindenburg Line
 Channel & North Sea (1939–1945)
 Norway (1940)*

 Atlantic (1941–1945)*
 Bismarck*
 Biscay (1941–1945)
 Normandy (1944)*
 South Atlantic (1982)
 Gulf (1991)
 Iraq (2003)
 Afghanistan (2001–2014)

See also
 List of Royal Air Force aircraft squadrons

References

Notes

Bibliography

 Ashworth, Chris. Encyclopedia of Modern Royal Air Force Squadrons. Wellingborough, UK: Patrick Stevens Limited, 1989. .
 Bowyer, Michael J.F. and John D.R. Rawlings. Squadron Codes, 1937–56. Cambridge, UK: Patrick Stephens Ltd., 1979. .
 Flintham, Vic and Andrew Thomas. Combat Codes: A full explanation and listing of British, Commonwealth and Allied air force unit codes since 1938. Shrewsbury, Shropshire, UK: Airlife Publishing Ltd., 2003. .
 Halley, James J. Famous Maritime Squadrons of the RAF, Volume 1. Windsor, Berkshire, UK: Hylton Lacy Publishers Ltd., 1973. .
 Halley, James J. The Squadrons of the Royal Air Force & Commonwealth, 1918–1988. Tonbridge, Kent, UK: Air-Britain (Historians) Ltd., 1988. .
 Jefford, C.G. RAF Squadrons, a Comprehensive Record of the Movement and Equipment of all RAF Squadrons and their Antecedents since 1912. Shrewsbury: Airlife Publishing, 2001. .
 Lewis, Peter. Squadron Histories: R.F.C, R.N.A.S and R.A.F., 1912–59. London: Putnam, 1959.
 Rawlings, John D.R. Coastal, Support and Special Squadrons of the RAF and their Aircraft. London: Jane's Publishing Company Ltd., 1982. .
 Rawlings, John D.R. Fighter Squadrons of the RAF and their Aircraft. London: Macdonald and Jane's (Publishers) Ltd., 1969 (new edition 1976, reprinted 1978). .

External links

 Squadron page on castlearchdale.net
 Squadron page on museum.guernsey.net
 MoD website
 Squadron history on RafWeb

201 Squadron
01
Military units and formations established in 1914
Military units and formations of the Royal Air Force in World War I
Aircraft squadrons of the Royal Air Force in World War II
Maritime patrol aircraft units and formations
Military units and formations of the United Kingdom in the Falklands War
Guernsey
1914 establishments in the United Kingdom
Military units and formations disestablished in 2011